The 2011–12 All-Ireland Senior Club Football Championship was the 42nd staging of the All-Ireland Senior Club Football Championship since its establishment by the Gaelic Athletic Association in 1970-71. The championship began on 16 October 2011 and ended on 31 March 2012.

Crossmaglen Rangers entered the championship as the defending champions.

On 31 March 2012, Crossmaglen Rangers won the championship following a 2-19 to 1-07 defeat of Garrycastle in the All-Ireland final replay at Kingspan Breffni Park. It was their sixth championship title overall and their second title in succession.

Garrycastle's Dessie Dolan was the championship's top scorer with 0-29.

Results

Connacht Senior Club Football Championship

Quarter-final

Semi-finals

Final

Leinster Senior Club Football Championship

First round

Quarter-finals

Semi-finals

Final

Munster Senior Club Football Championship

Quarter-finals

Semi-finals

Final

Ulster Senior Club Football Championship

Preliminary round

Quarter-finals

Semi-finals

Final

All-Ireland Senior Club Football Championship

Quarter-final

Semi-finals

Finals

Championship statistics

Top scorers

Overall

In a single game

Miscellaneous

 Garrycastle won the Leinster Club Championship for the first time in their history. They were also the first team from Westmeath to win the provincial title.

References

All-Ireland Senior Club Football Championship
All-Ireland Senior Club Football Championship
All-Ireland Senior Club Football Championship